Yia Vang (born 1984) is a Hmong-American chef in St. Paul, Minnesota.

Early life and education 
Vang was born in Ban Vinai refugee camp in Thailand after his family had fled Laos at the end of the Vietnamese War after the fall of Saigon. His father, Nhia Lor Vang, and mother, Pang Her, both widowed during the crossing of the Mekong, met at the camp in 1977 and married in 1978. Vang was born in 1984.

In 1988, when he was four, his family immigrated to the United States, first to Lancaster County, Pennsylvania, and then in 1997 to Port Edwards, Wisconsin; while growing up he learning butchering when his family would buy whole animals. He graduated in 2010 from the University of Wisconsin-La Crosse with a degree in communications.

Career 
Vang moved to the Minneapolis area and worked at Gavin Kaysen’s Spoon and Stable and other restaurants, first as a dishwasher and then as a cook. He noticed that while the twin cities area has the largest Hmong population outside of Asia, it didn't have a restaurant dedicated to Hmong cuisine. 

Vang opened an estimated 100 popups that he called Union Hmong Kitchen with menus including his father's sausage recipe and his mother's hot sauce recipe. He initially tried to cater to midwestern tastes but eventually decided it was disrespectful to Hmong food and decided to focus on traditional Hmong flavors and techniques. In 2019 he was named MSP Magazine's Chef of the Year.

In 2020 he started a crowdfunding campaign to fund opening of a restaurant. The COVID-19 pandemic slowed the development, and he started a podcast called White on Rice. Union Hmong Kitchen eventually opened a permanent space in a  food stall in a food hall in Minneapolis' North Loop neighborhood. Union Hmong Kitchen was the first Hmong food served at the Minnesota State Fair.

As of 2022 Vang was still developing Vinai, named after the refugee camp in which he was born, which Esquire called one of the first dedicated Hmong restaurants in the United States.

In June of 2022 he appeared on Iron Chef and in November of 2022 he started hosting Feral, a show that explores the culinary use of invasive species such as wild boar, on the Outdoor Channel.

Recognition 
In 2022 he was a James Beard Award finalist and Union Hmong Kitchen a semifinalist. Francis Lam in 2021 called Vang "one of America's leading voices in Hmong cooking".

Personal life 
In 2021 Vang became a United States citizen.

References 

American people of Hmong descent
Chefs from Minnesota
University of Wisconsin–La Crosse alumni
1984 births
Living people